Mitar Bakić (Berislavci near Podgorica, 7 November 1908 - Belgrade, 25 November 1960), was a Yugoslav politician, general and People's Hero of Yugoslavia. During World War II, he was political commissar of the 4th Montenegrin brigade, 2nd Proletarian Division and 2nd Corps. After the war, he was the chief of staff of Josip Broz Tito, secretary-general of the Yugoslav government and member of Yugoslav mission in United Nations. He also had rank of reserve lieutenant general of Yugoslav People's Army.

Gallery 

1908 births
1960 deaths
Yugoslav Partisans members
Recipients of the Order of the People's Hero
Generals of the Yugoslav People's Army